Lasse Lehmann (born May 20, 1996) is a German footballer who plays as a striker. His father is former footballer Knut Reinhardt and his stepfather is former footballer Jens Lehmann.

External links
 
 

1996 births
Living people
Association football forwards
German footballers
3. Liga players
Stuttgarter Kickers II players
Stuttgarter Kickers players
SpVgg Unterhaching II players
Boston College Eagles men's soccer players